Kamal Khujandi (1320-1400 AD), also Kamal Khojandi, Kamaleddin Khojandi, or Kamal-E Khojandi, was a Persian Sufi and Persian ghazal poet of the 14th century (8th century hijri).

He was born in  Khujand, today the capital of Sughd in Tajikistan.  He lived in Tabriz and died in 1400 CE (807 AH).

He is counted among the great romantic poets of the 14th century, like Amir Khosrow Dehlavi, Khwaju Kermani and Hafez. He was also a contemporary of Hafez. The modern Persian novelist and short story writer Sadegh Hedayat and his family trace their ancestry to Kamal Khojandi.

Khojandi's tomb is located in the Tomb of Two Kamals at Tabriz, Iran, beside the tomb of Kamaleddin Behzad. There is also a statue of Kamal Khojandi nearby.

In 1996, a monument and museum was erected in the poet’s homeland in Tajikistan.

See also

 Kamaleddin Behzad
 Sadegh Hedayat
 List of Persian poets and authors
 Persian literature

References

External links 
  Hedayat family considered to be his descendants.

Year of birth unknown
1400 deaths
People from Khujand
14th-century Persian-language poets
Sufi poets
Iranian Sufis
Writers from Tabriz
14th-century Iranian people